Mount Agrihan is a stratovolcano on the uninhabited island of Agrihan in the Pacific Ocean, located in the Northern Mariana Islands, an insular area and commonwealth of the United States.

History
The volcano's last known eruption was in 1917.

An expedition organized by John D. Mitchler and Reid Larson made the first complete ascent to the summit of this peak on June 1, 2018.

References

20th-century volcanic events
Stratovolcanoes of the United States
Active volcanoes
Volcanoes of the Northern Mariana Islands
Holocene stratovolcanoes